Káva is a village in Pest county, Hungary.

References

Populated places in Pest County